East Clinton Local High School is a public high school in Sabina, Ohio in the United States. It is the only high school in the East Clinton Local School District. The district was formed in 1966 from two districts of New Kenton Local Schools (formed the year before by combining Simon Kenton Local Schools and New Vienna Local Schools) and Sabina Local Schools. East Clinton Local Schools cover the eastern portion of Clinton County. It serves the students in the townships of Richland, Wayne, Wilson, and Green, as well as the villages of Sabina, Reesville, Lees Creek and New Vienna. The first graduating class was in 1966. Today there are about 1,600 students district wide, averaging approximately 450 at East Clinton High School.

Athletics 
East Clinton's athletic teams, known as the Astros, formerly participated in the Fort Ancient Valley Conference (1974–1977) and Scioto Valley Conference. In 2012, East Clinton left the Southern Buckeye Athletic/Academic Conference (SBAAC) to join the South Central Ohio League, only to return to the SBAAC in 2017 upon the latter's closure.

Schools in East Clinton Local School District

Community events 
On October 27, 2012, U.S. Vice Presidential candidate and later  Speaker of the House Paul Ryan visited the school as part of a campaign rally for his running mate, Mitt Romney. The event was attended by over 700 local residents.

References

External links 
 

High schools in Clinton County, Ohio
Public high schools in Ohio